North Docks good railway station was a goods station in Liverpool between Blackstone Street & Walter Street. It was connected to the Lancashire and Yorkshire Railway's Liverpool, Ormskirk and Preston Railway by a junction to the North of Sandhills railway station



References

Disused railway goods stations in Great Britain
Disused railway stations in Liverpool
Former Lancashire and Yorkshire Railway stations